is a Japanese manga artist Best known for creating Flame of Recca and MÄR. He was an assistant of Kazuhiro Fujita. He made his debut as a manga artist after he received an honorable mention in Shinjin Comic Taisho (Shogakukan Beginners Editions) with a oneshot called Ken 2 Strenger.

Works
  (1994 Shogakukan)
  (1995–2002 Shogakukan)
 MÄR (2003–2007 Shogakukan)
  (2008–2011 Shogakukan)
  (2008 Shogakukan)
  (2014–2017 Takeshobo)
  (2018–present Shogakukan)

Assistants
Koichiro Hoshino (Flame of Recca, MÄR)
Makoto Raiku (Flame of Recca)
Michiteru Kusaba (Flame of Recca)
Hisashi Nosaka (Flame of Recca)
Masahiro Ikeno (MÄR)

References

External links

 https://twitter.com/anzainobuyuki

Manga artists from Chiba Prefecture
Living people
Japanese graphic novelists
1972 births
People from Chiba Prefecture